Robert Harvey Rines (August 30, 1922November 1, 2009) was an American lawyer, inventor, musician, and composer. He is perhaps best known for his efforts to find and identify the Loch Ness Monster.

Biography

Rines was born August 30, 1922 in Boston.  He received a Bachelor of Science degree from the Massachusetts Institute of Technology (MIT) in 1943, a Juris Doctor from Georgetown University in 1946, and a Ph.D. from National Chiao Tung University in Taiwan in 1972. During World War II Rines served as an Army Signal Corps officer and helped develop the Microwave Early Warning System.

He held numerous U.S. patents on a wide variety of subjects. Although various on-line sources give their number as 80, 100, and even 200, the list published by the Franklin Pierce Law Center  gives their number as 81, and 3 additional ones (Nos. 6,175,326, 7,314,178, and 7,392,192) can also be found in the U.S. Patent and Trademark Office records. However, 12 of those in the larger list are referred to as "applications only", leaving 72 actually issued U.S. patents.

He was a renowned intellectual property lawyer, and in March 2004 received the Boston Patent Law Association "Lifetime Achievement Award" for his contributions in the field of intellectual property. Rines also was inducted as member of the National Inventors Hall of Fame in 1994 and the U.S. Army Signal Corps Wall of Fame. He was the founder of the Franklin Pierce Law Center, a private law school located in Concord, New Hampshire, and the Academy of Applied Science, a Massachusetts and New Hampshire based organization dedicated to stimulating the interest of high school students in science, technology, and inventions.  He was a lecturer at Harvard University and MIT and a member of the Technical Advisory Board of the U.S. Department of Commerce. In the early 80's Mr. Rines founded NEFFE, New England Fish Farming Enterprises, a Bristol, New Hampshire commercial Salmon farming operation.

Rines was also an accomplished musician and composer. At age eleven he played a violin duet with Albert Einstein at a summer camp in Maine.  As a composer he wrote music for both Broadway and off-Broadway shows, including Blast and Bravos, a musical based on the life of H. L. Mencken.  He also composed scores for O'Casey's Drums Under the Windows, O'Neill's Long Voyage Home, and Strindberg's Creditors. He shared a New York Emmy Award with playwright Paul Shyre in 1987 for the television and later Broadway play Hizzoner!

His philanthropic activities included establishing the GREAT Fund, providing educational grants for a large extended family in perpetuity. 

In May 2008 Rines retired from his position at MIT after 45 years. He died November 1, 2009 at the age of 87.

Quest for "Nessie"

During a visit to Scotland in 1972, Rines reported seeing "a large, darkish hump, covered ... with rough, mottled skin, like the back of an elephant" in Loch Ness.  Over the next 35 years he mounted numerous expeditions to the loch and searched its depths with sophisticated electronic and photographic equipment, mostly of his own design.  While his investigations produced multiple theories and several tantalizing photographs, he was unable to produce sufficient evidence to convince the scientific community of the existence of the fabled monster. For this he received the Dinsdale Memorial Award in 2004.

References

 
 Robert H. Rines. Invent Now. Accessed on September 24, 2005.
 Dr. Robert H. Rines. Lord Corporation. Accessed on September 24, 2005.
 Money Magazine. They Saved Small Business. Accessed on August 28, 2008.
  MIT. Dr. Robert H. Rines: An Appreciation.  Accessed on October 9, 2008.
 Inventors Digest. "Robert H. Rines 1922–2009". Accessed on November 2, 2009.

External links
 Robert Rines - Daily Telegraph obituary
 Archival Recordings of Bob Rines Teaching at MIT, 1974 - Contributed by Christopher E. Strangio
 Academy of Applied Science - History of the Academy of Applied Science

1922 births
2009 deaths
Cryptozoologists
American Unitarians
Georgetown University Law Center alumni
Harvard University staff
Massachusetts Institute of Technology alumni
Georgetown University alumni
National Chiao Tung University alumni
20th-century American inventors
United States Army personnel of World War II
American expatriates in Taiwan